Presagio ("Omen") is a 1975 Mexican film directed and written by Luis Alcoriza.

External links
 

1975 films
Mexican fantasy comedy-drama films
1970s Spanish-language films
Films directed by Luis Alcoriza
1970s Mexican films